Lieutenant General Sir Tyrone Richard Urch,  (born 12 June 1965) is a former senior British Army officer who served as General Officer Commanding, Force Troops Command and later Commander, Home Command.

Early life and education
Urch was born on 12 June 1965. He was educated at Warminster School and Welbeck College. He studied at Cranfield University (BEng) and King's College London (MA).

Military career
Urch was commissioned into the Royal Engineers on 4 June 1984. In 2001, as officer commanding 20 Field Squadron, he led the construction of two schools, a new hangar at Price Barracks and a jungle research station in Belize. He became Commanding Officer of 22 Engineer Regiment in 2004, and was deployed to Iraq later that year. He went on to be Commander of 1st Mechanised Brigade in December 2008, Assistant Chief of Staff, Operations at the Permanent Joint Headquarters in Northwood in December 2010, and Chief of Staff for Land Forces in October 2012. After that he became General Officer Commanding Force Troops Command in February 2015; he was promoted to lieutenant-general and became Commander Home Command in June 2018. He retired in June 2021.

Urch was appointed Commander of the Order of the British Empire (CBE) in the 2011 Birthday Honours, and Knight Commander of the Order of the British Empire (KBE) in the 2021 New Year Honours.

References

|-
 

|-

1965 births
Alumni of Cranfield University
Alumni of King's College London
British Army generals
British Army personnel of the Iraq War
Knights Commander of the Order of the British Empire
Living people
People educated at Warminster School
Royal Engineers officers
People educated at Welbeck Defence Sixth Form College